The cougar (Puma concolor) (KOO-gər) is a large cat native to the Americas. Its range spans from the Canadian Yukon to the southern Andes in South America and is the most widespread of any large wild terrestrial mammal in the Western Hemisphere. It is an adaptable, generalist species, occurring in most American habitat types. This wide range has brought it many common names, including puma, mountain lion, catamount and panther (for the Florida sub-population). It is the second-largest cat in the New World, after the jaguar (Panthera onca). Secretive and largely solitary by nature, the cougar is properly considered both nocturnal and crepuscular, although daytime sightings do occur. Despite its size, the cougar is more closely related to smaller felines, including the domestic cat (Felis catus) than to any species of the subfamily Pantherinae.

The cougar is an ambush predator that pursues a wide variety of prey. Primary food sources are ungulates, particularly deer, but it also hunts smaller prey such as rodents. It prefers habitats with dense underbrush and rocky areas for stalking, but also lives in open areas. Cougars are territorial and live at low population densities. Individual home ranges depend on terrain, vegetation and abundance of prey. While large, it is not always the apex predator in its range, yielding prey it has killed to American black bears, grizzly bears and packs of wolves. It is reclusive and mostly avoids people. Fatal attacks on humans are rare, but increased in North America as more people entered cougar habitat and built farms.

Intensive hunting following European colonization of the Americas and ongoing human development into cougar habitat has caused the cougar populations to drop in most parts of its historical range. In particular, the eastern cougar population is considered to have been mostly extirpated in eastern North America at the beginning of the 20th century, with the exception of the isolated Florida panther subpopulation.

Naming and etymology
The word cougar is borrowed from the Portuguese çuçuarana, via French; it was originally derived from the Tupi language. A current form in Brazil is suçuarana. In the 17th century, Georg Marcgrave named it cuguacu ara. Marcgrave's rendering was reproduced in 1648 by his associate Willem Piso. Cuguacu ara was then adopted by John Ray in 1693. In 1774, Georges-Louis Leclerc, Comte de Buffon converted cuguacu ara to cuguar, which was later modified to "cougar" in English.

The cougar holds the Guinness record for the animal with the greatest number of names, with over 40 in English alone. "Puma" is the common name used in Latin America and most parts of Europe. The term puma is also sometimes used in the United States. The first use of puma in English dates to 1777, introduced from Spanish from the Quechua language. In the western United States and Canada, it is also called "mountain lion", a name first used in writing in 1858. Other names include "panther" and "catamount" (meaning "cat of the mountains").

Taxonomy and evolution
Felis concolor was the scientific name proposed by Carl Linnaeus in 1771 for a cat with a long tail from Brazil. The second half of the name, "concolor" is Latin for "of uniform color". It was placed in the genus Puma by William Jardine in 1834.
This genus is part of the Felinae. The cougar is most closely related to the jaguarundi and the cheetah.

Subspecies

Following Linnaeus' first scientific description of the cougar, 32 cougar zoological specimens were described and proposed as subspecies until the late 1980s. Genetic analysis of cougar mitochondrial DNA indicate that many of these are too similar to be recognized as distinct at a molecular level, but that only six phylogeographic groups exist. The Florida panther samples showed a low microsatellite variation, possibly due to inbreeding. Following this research, the authors of Mammal Species of the World recognized the following six subspecies in 2005:
 P. c. concolor  includes the synonyms bangsi, incarum, osgoodi, soasoaranna, sussuarana, soderstromii, suçuaçuara, and wavula
 P. c. puma  includes the synonyms araucanus, concolor, patagonica, pearsoni, and puma 
 P. c. couguar  includes arundivaga, aztecus, browni, californica, floridana, hippolestes, improcera, kaibabensis, mayensis, missoulensis, olympus, oregonensis, schorgeri, stanleyana, vancouverensis, and youngi
 P. c. costaricensis 
 P. c. anthonyi  includes acrocodia, borbensis, capricornensis, concolor, greeni, and nigra
 P. c. cabrerae  includes hudsonii and puma proposed by Marcelli in 1922
In 2006, the Florida panther was still referred to as a distinct subspecies P. c. coryi in research works.

, the Cat Classification Taskforce of the Cat Specialist Group recognizes only two subspecies as valid:
P. c. concolor in South America, possibly excluding the region northwest of the Andes 
P. c. couguar in North and Central America and possibly northwestern South America

Evolution

The family Felidae is believed to have originated in Asia about 11 million years ago (Mya). Taxonomic research on felids remains partial, and much of what is known about their evolutionary history is based on mitochondrial DNA analysis.
Significant confidence intervals exist with suggested dates. In the latest genomic study of the Felidae, the common ancestor of today's Leopardus, Lynx, Puma, Prionailurus, and Felis lineages migrated across the Bering land bridge into the Americas 8.0 to 8.5 million years ago. The lineages subsequently diverged in that order. North American felids then invaded South America 2–4Mya as part of the Great American Interchange, following the formation of the Isthmus of Panama.

The cheetah lineage is suggested by some studies to have diverged from the Puma lineage in the Americas and migrated back to Asia and Africa, while other research suggests the cheetah diverged in the Old World itself.
A high level of genetic similarity has been found among North American cougar populations, suggesting they are all fairly recent descendants of a small ancestral group. Culver et al. propose the original North American cougar population was extirpated during the Pleistocene extinctions some 10,000 years ago, when other large mammals, such as Smilodon, also disappeared. North America was then repopulated by South American cougars.

A coprolite identified as from a cougar was excavated in Argentina's Catamarca Province and dated to 17,002–16,573 years old. It contained Toxascaris leonina eggs. This finding indicates that the cougar and the parasite existed in South America since at least the Late Pleistocene.

Characteristics

The head of the cougar is round and the ears are erect. Its powerful forequarters, neck, and jaw serve to grasp and hold large prey. It has four retractile claws on its hind paws and five on its forepaws, of which one is a dewclaw. The larger front feet and claws are adaptations for clutching prey.

Cougars are slender and agile members of the Felidae. Males generally weigh . Cougar size is smallest close to the equator and larger towards the poles.

Depending on the locality, cougars can be smaller or bigger than jaguars, but are less muscular and not as powerfully built, so their weight is, on average, less. Whereas cougars tend to be larger as distance increases from the equator, which crosses the northern portion of South America, jaguars are generally smaller north of the Amazon River in South America and larger south of it.

Cougar coloring is plain (hence the Latin concolor ["one color"] in the scientific name), but can vary greatly across individuals, and even siblings. The coat is typically tawny, but it otherwise ranges from silvery-grey to reddish with lighter patches on the underbody, including the jaws, chin, and throat. Infants are spotted and born with blue eyes and rings on their tails; juveniles are pale and dark spots remain on their flanks. A leucistic individual was seen in Serra dos Órgãos National Park in Rio de Janeiro in 2013 when it was recorded by a camera trap, indicating that extremely rare, pure white individual cougars do exist in the species.

The cougar has large paws and proportionally the largest hind legs in the Felidae, allowing for its great leaping and short-sprint ability.

Distribution and habitat

The cougar has the largest range of any wild land animal in the Americas, spanning 110 degrees of latitude from the Yukon Territory in Canada to the southern Andes in Chile. The species was extirpated from eastern North America, aside from Florida, but they may be recolonizing their former range and isolated populations have been documented east of their contemporary ranges in both the Midwestern US and Canada.

In the Santa Ana Mountains, it prefers steep canyons, escarpments, rim rocks and dense brush.
In Mexico, it was recorded in the Sierra de San Carlos. In the Yucatán Peninsula, it inhabits secondary and semi-deciduous forests in El Eden Ecological Reserve. 
In El Salvador, it was recorded in lower montane forest in Montecristo National Park and in a river basin in the Morazán Department above  in 2019.
In Colombia, it was recorded in a palm oil plantation close to a riparian forest in the Llanos Basin, and close to water bodies in the Magdalena River Valley.
In the human-modified landscape of central Argentina, it inhabits bushland with abundant vegetation cover and prey species.

Behavior and ecology
Cougars are important keystone species in Western Hemisphere ecosystems, linking numerous different species at many trophic levels. In a comprehensive literature review of more than 160 studies on cougar ecology, ecological interactions with 485 other species in cougar-inhabited ecosystems have been shown to involve different areas of interaction, ranging from the use of other species as food sources and prey, fear effects on potential prey, effects from carcass remains left behind, to competitive effects on other predator species in shared habitat. The most common research topic in the literature used here was the diet of the cougar and the regulation of its prey.

Hunting and diet

The cougar is a generalist, hypercarnivore. They prefer large mammals such as mule deer, white-tailed deer, elk, moose, mountain goat and bighorn sheep. They will opportunistically take smaller prey such as rodents, lagomorphs, smaller carnivores, birds and even domestic animals including pets. The mean weight of cougar vertebrate prey increases with its body weight and is lower in areas closer to the equator. A survey of North America research found 68% of prey items were ungulates, especially deer. Only the Florida panther showed variation, often preferring feral hogs and armadillos.

Investigations at Yellowstone National Park showed that elk, followed by mule deer, were the cougar's primary targets; the prey base is shared with the park's wolves, with which the cougar competes for resources. A study on winter kills from November to April in Alberta showed that ungulates accounted for greater than 99% of the cougar diet. Learned, individual prey recognition was observed, as some cougars rarely killed bighorn sheep, while others relied heavily on the species.

In the Central and South American cougar range, the ratio of deer in the diet declines. Small to mid-sized mammals are preferred, including large rodents such as the capybara. Ungulates accounted for only 35% of prey items in one survey, about half that of North America. Competition with the larger jaguar in South America has been suggested for the decline in the size of prey items. However, a study by Gutiérrez-González and López-González showed that the cougar and jaguar in Central or North America may share the same prey, depending on its abundance. Other listed prey species of the cougar include mice, porcupines, beavers, raccoons, hares, guanacoes, peccaries, vicuna, rheas, and wild turkeys. Birds and small reptiles are sometimes preyed upon in the south, but this is rarely recorded in North America. Magellanic penguins (Spheniscus magellanicus) constitute the majority of prey items in cougar diet in Patagonia's Bosques Petrificados de Jaramillo National Park and Monte León National Park.

Although capable of sprinting, the cougar is typically an ambush predator. It stalks through brush and trees, across ledges, or other covered spots, before delivering a powerful leap onto the back of its prey and a suffocating neck bite. The cougar is capable of breaking the neck of some of its smaller prey with a strong bite and momentum bearing the animal to the ground. Kills are generally estimated around one large ungulate every two weeks. The period shrinks for females raising young, and may be as short as one kill every three days when cubs are nearly mature around 15 months. The cat drags a kill to a preferred spot, covers it with brush, and returns to feed over a period of days. The cougar is generally reported to not be a scavenger, but deer carcasses left exposed for study were scavenged by cougars in California, suggesting more opportunistic behavior.

Interactions with other predators

Aside from humans, no species preys upon mature cougars in the wild, although conflicts with other predators or scavengers occur. Of the large predators in Yellowstone National Park – the grizzly bear, the black bear, the gray wolf, and the cougar – the massive grizzly bear appears dominant, often (but not always) able to drive a gray wolf pack, an American black bear, and a cougar off their kills. One study found that grizzlies and American black bears visited 24% of cougar kills in Yellowstone and Glacier National Parks, usurping 10% of carcasses. Bears gained up to 113% and cougars lost up to 26% of their respective daily energy requirements from these encounters. In Colorado and California, American black bears were found to visit 48% and 77% of kills, respectively. In general, cougars are subordinate to American black bears when it comes to kills and when bears are most active, the cats take prey more frequently and spend less time feeding on each kill. Unlike several subordinate predators from other ecosystems, cougars do not appear to take advantage of spatial or temporal refuges to avoid their competitors.

The gray wolf and the cougar compete more directly for prey, mostly in winter. Packs of wolves can steal cougars' kills, and there are some documented cases of cougars being killed by them. One report describes a large pack of seven to 11 wolves killing a female cougar and her kittens, while in nearby Sun Valley, Idaho, a 2-year-old male cougar was found dead, apparently killed by a wolf pack. Conversely, one-to-one confrontations tend to be dominated by the cat, and there are various documented accounts where wolves have been ambushed and killed, including adult male specimens. Wolves more broadly affect cougar population dynamics and distribution by dominating territory and prey opportunities, and disrupting the feline's behavior. Preliminary research in Yellowstone, for instance, has shown displacement of the cougar by wolves. One researcher in Oregon noted: "When there is a pack around, cougars are not comfortable around their kills or raising kittens [...] A lot of times a big cougar will kill a wolf, but the pack phenomenon changes the table." Both species are capable of killing mid-sized predators, such as bobcats, Canada lynxes, wolverines and coyotes, and tend to suppress their numbers. Although cougars can kill coyotes, the latter have been documented attempting to prey on cougar cubs.

In the southern portion of its range, the cougar and jaguar share overlapping territory. The jaguar tends to take the larger prey where ranges overlap, reducing both the cougar's potential size and the likelihood of direct competition between the two cats. Cougars appear better than jaguars at exploiting a broader prey niche and smaller prey.

Social spacing and interactions

Like almost all cats, the cougar is a mostly solitary animal. Only mothers and kittens live in groups, with adults meeting rarely. While generally loners, cougars will reciprocally share kills with one another and seem to organize themselves into small communities defined by the territories of dominant males. Cats within these areas socialize more frequently with each other than with outsiders.

Home range sizes and overall cougar abundance depend on terrain, vegetation, and prey abundance. Research has shown cougar abundances from 0.5 animals to as many as seven per .

Male home ranges include or overlap with those of females but, at least where studied, not with those of other males. Home ranges of females overlap slightly. Males create scrapes composed of leaves and duff with their hind feet, and mark them with urine and sometimes feces. When males encounter each other, they vocalize and may engage in violent conflict if neither backs down.

Cougars communicate with various vocalizations. Aggressive sounds include growls, spits, snarls and hisses. During the mating season, estrus females produce caterwauls or yowls to attract mates and males respond with similar vocals. Mothers and offspring keep in contact with whistles, chirps and mews.

Reproduction and life cycle

Females reach sexual maturity at the age of 18 months to three years and are in estrus for about eight days of a 23-day cycle; the gestation period is approximately 91 days. Both adult males and females may mate with multiple partners and a female's litter can have multiple paternities. Copulation is brief but frequent. Chronic stress can result in low reproductive rates in captivity as well as in the field.

Gestation is 82–103 days long. Only females are involved in parenting. Litter size is between one and six cubs; typically two. Caves and other alcoves that offer protection are used as litter dens. Born blind, cubs are completely dependent on their mother at first, and begin to be weaned at around three months of age. As they grow, they begin to go out on forays with their mother, first visiting kill sites, and after six months beginning to hunt small prey on their own. Kitten survival rates are just over one per litter.

Juveniles remain with their mothers for one to two years. When the females reaches estrous again, their offspring must disperse or the male will kill them. Males tend to disperse further than females. One study has shown a high mortality rate amongst cougars that travel farthest from their maternal range, often due to conflicts with other cougars. In a study area in New Mexico, males dispersed farther than females, traversed large expanses of non-cougar habitat and were probably most responsible for nuclear gene flow between habitat patches.

Life expectancy in the wild is reported at 8 to 13 years, and probably averages 8 to 10; a female of at least 18 years was reported killed by hunters on Vancouver Island. Cougars may live as long as 20 years in captivity. Causes of death in the wild include disability and disease, competition with other cougars, starvation, accidents, and, where allowed, hunting. The feline immunodeficiency virus is well-adapted to the cougar.

Conservation

The cougar has been listed as Least Concern on the IUCN Red List since 2008. However, it is also listed on CITES Appendix II. Hunting it is prohibited in California, Costa Rica, Honduras, Nicaragua, Guatemala, Panama, Venezuela, Colombia, French Guiana, Suriname, Bolivia, Brazil, Chile, Paraguay, Uruguay and most of Argentina. Hunting is regulated in Canada, Mexico, Peru and the United States. Establishing wildlife corridors and protecting sufficient range areas are critical for the sustainability of cougar populations. Between one and four new individuals entering a population per decade markedly increases persistence, thus highlighting the importance of habitat corridors.

The Florida panther population is afforded protection under the Endangered Species Act.
The Texas Mountain Lion Conservation Project was launched in 2009 and aimed at raising awareness of local people about the status and ecological role of the cougar, and mitigating conflict between landowners and cougars.

The cougar is threatened by habitat loss, habitat fragmentation, and depletion of its prey base due to poaching. Hunting is legal in western United States. In Florida heavy traffic causes frequent accidents involving cougars. Highways are a major barrier for dispersal of cougars.
The cougar populations in California are becoming fragmented with the increase of human population and infrastructure growth in the state.

Relationships with humans

Attacks on humans

In North America

Due to the expanding human population, cougar ranges increasingly overlap with areas inhabited by humans. Attacks on humans are very rare, as cougar prey recognition is a learned behavior and they do not generally recognize humans as prey. In a 10-year study in New Mexico of wild cougars who were not habituated to humans, the animals did not exhibit threatening behavior to researchers who approached closely (median distance=18.5 m; 61 feet) except in 6% of cases; 14/16 of those were females with cubs. Attacks on people, livestock, and pets may occur when a puma habituates to humans or is in a condition of severe starvation. Attacks are most frequent during late spring and summer, when juvenile cougars leave their mothers and search for new territory.

Between 1890 and 1990 in North America there were 53 reported, confirmed attacks on humans, resulting in 48 nonfatal injuries and 10 deaths of humans (the total is greater than 53 because some attacks had more than one victim). By 2004, the count had climbed to 88 attacks and 20 deaths.

Within North America, the distribution of attacks is not uniform. The heavily populated state of California saw a dozen attacks 1986 to 2004 (after just three from 1890 to 1985), including three fatalities. Washington state was the site of a fatal attack in 2018, its first since 1924. Lightly populated New Mexico reported an attack in 2008, the first there since 1974.

As with many predators, a cougar may attack if cornered, if a fleeing human stimulates their instinct to chase, or if a person "plays dead". Standing still may cause the cougar to consider a person easy prey. Exaggerating the threat to the animal through intense eye contact, loud shouting, and any other action to appear larger and more menacing, may make the animal retreat. Fighting back with sticks and rocks, or even bare hands, is often effective in persuading an attacking cougar to disengage.

When cougars do attack, they usually employ their characteristic neck bite, attempting to position their teeth between the vertebrae and into the spinal cord. Neck, head, and spinal injuries are common and sometimes fatal. Children are at greatest risk of attack, and least likely to survive an encounter. Detailed research into attacks prior to 1991 showed that 64% of all victims – and almost all fatalities – were children. The same study showed the highest proportion of attacks to have occurred in British Columbia, particularly on Vancouver Island where cougar populations are especially dense. Preceding attacks on humans, cougars display aberrant behavior, such as activity during daylight hours, a lack of fear of humans, and stalking humans. There have sometimes been incidents of pet cougars mauling people.

Research on new wildlife collars may be able to reduce human-animal conflicts by predicting when and where predatory animals hunt. This may save the lives of humans, pets, and livestock as well as the lives of these large predatory mammals that are important to the balance of ecosystems.

In South America
Pumas in the southern cone of America – often called Argentine cougars by North Americans – are reputed to be extremely reluctant to attack man; in legend, they defended people against jaguars. The nineteenth century naturalists Félix de Azara and William Henry Hudson thought that attacks on people, even children or sleeping adults, did not happen. Hudson, citing anecdotal evidence from hunters, claimed that pumas were positively inhibited from attacking people, even in self-defense. In fact, attacks on humans, although exceedingly rare, have occurred.

An early, authenticated, non-fatal case occurred near Lake Viedma, Patagonia in 1877 when a female mauled the Argentine scientist Francisco P. Moreno; Moreno afterwards showed the scars to Theodore Roosevelt. In this instance, however, Moreno had been wearing a guanaco-hide poncho round his neck and head as protection against the cold; in Patagonia the guanaco is the puma's chief prey animal. Another authenticated case occurred in 1997 in Iguazú National Park in northeastern Argentina, when the 20-month-old son of a ranger was killed by a female puma. Forensic analysis found specimens of the child's hair and clothing fibers in the animal's stomach. In this area the coatí is the puma's chief prey. Despite prohibitory signs, coatis are hand-fed by tourists in the park, causing unnatural approximation between cougars and humans. This particular puma had been raised in captivity and released into the wild. On March 13, 2012, Erica Cruz, a 23-year-old shepherdess was found dead in a mountainous area near Rosario de Lerma, Salta Province, in northwestern Argentina. Claw incisions, which severed a jugular vein, indicated that the attacker was a felid; differential diagnosis ruled out other possible perpetrators. There were no bite marks on the victim, who had been herding goats. In 2019 in Córdoba Province, Argentina an elderly man was badly injured by a cougar after he attempted to defend his dog from it, while in neighbouring Chile a 28-year-old woman was attacked and killed in Corral, in Los Ríos Region, on October 20, 2020.

Fatal attacks by other carnivores such as feral dogs can be misattributed to cougars without appropriate forensic knowledge.

Predation on domestic animals

During the early years of ranching, cougars were considered on par with wolves in destructiveness. According to figures in Texas in 1990, 86 calves (0.0006% of Texas' 13.4 million cattle and calves), 253 mohair goats, 302 mohair kids, 445 sheep (0.02% of Texas' 2 million sheep and lambs) and 562 lambs (0.04% of Texas' 1.2 million lambs) were confirmed to have been killed by cougars that year. In Nevada in 1992, cougars were confirmed to have killed nine calves, one horse, four foals, five goats, 318 sheep, and 400 lambs. In both reports, sheep were the most frequently attacked. Some instances of surplus killing have resulted in the deaths of 20 sheep in one attack. A cougar's killing bite is applied to the back of the neck, head, or throat and the cat inflicts puncture marks with its claws usually seen on the sides and underside of the prey, sometimes also shredding the prey as it holds on. Coyotes also typically bite the throat, but the work of a cougar is generally clean, while bites inflicted by coyotes and dogs leave ragged edges. The size of the tooth puncture marks also helps distinguish kills made by cougars from those made by smaller predators.

Remedial hunting appears to have the paradoxical effect of increased livestock predation and complaints of human-cougar conflicts. In a 2013 study the most important predictor of cougar problems were remedial hunting of cougars the previous year. Each additional cougar on the landscape increased predation and human-cougar complaints by 5%, but each additional animal killed on the landscape during the previous year increased complaints by 50%. The effect had a dose-response relationship with very heavy (100% removal of adult cougars) remedial hunting leading to a 150% – 340% increase in livestock and human conflicts. This effect is attributed to the removal of older cougars that have learned to avoid people and their replacement by younger males that react differently to humans. Remedial hunting enables younger males to enter the former territories of the older animals. Predation by cougars on dogs "is widespread, but occurs at low frequencies".

In mythology
The grace and power of the cougar have been widely admired in the cultures of the indigenous peoples of the Americas. The Inca city of Cusco is reported to have been designed in the shape of a cougar, and the animal also gave its name to both Inca regions and people. The Moche people represented the cougar often in their ceramics. The sky and thunder god of the Inca, Viracocha, has been associated with the animal.

In North America, mythological descriptions of the cougar have appeared in the stories of the Hocąk language ("Ho-Chunk" or "Winnebago") of Wisconsin and Illinois and the Cheyenne, amongst others. To the Apache and Walapai of the Southwestern United States, the wail of the cougar was a harbinger of death. The Algonquins and Ojibwe believe that the cougar lived in the underworld and was wicked, whereas it was a sacred animal among the Cherokee.

See also
 List of largest cats
 Pumapard—hybrid of cougar and leopard

Explanatory notes

References

External links

 
 Cougar Tracks: How to identify cougar tracks in the wild
 
 Santa Cruz Puma Project
 Eastern Puma Research Network
 Felidae Conservation Fund
 Cougar Rewilding Foundation, formerly "Eastern Cougar Foundation"
 The Cougar Network --Using Science to Understand Cougar Ecology

 SaveTheCougar.org: Sightings of cougars in Michigan
 The Cougar Fund – Protecting America's Greatest Cat. A Definitive Resource About Cougars: Comprehensive, non-profit 501(c)(3) site with extensive information about cougars, from how to live safely in cougar country, to science abstracts, hunting regulations, state-by-state cougar management/policy info, and rare photos and videos of wild cougars.
 Living with California Mountain Lions
 Oregon's first fatal cougar attack in the wild claims hiker near Mount Hood

 
Apex predators
Big cats
Extant Middle Pleistocene first appearances
Fauna of the California chaparral and woodlands
Felids of Central America
Felids of North America
Felids of South America
Mammals described in 1771
Pleistocene carnivorans
Pleistocene mammals of North America
Pleistocene mammals of South America
Puma (genus)
Quaternary carnivorans
Taxa named by Carl Linnaeus